In Investigating Directorate: Serious Economic Offences and Others v Hyundai 2001 (1) SA 545 (CC), an important case in South African criminal procedure, a search warrant had been issued in terms of section 29 of the National Prosecuting Authority Act in respect of certain premises. A large quantity of documents, records and data had been seized from those premises.

Hyundai applied for an order declaring certain sections of that Act to be inconsistent with the Constitution.

The court granted the order to the extent that those sections authorised the search and seizure of property where there were no reasonable grounds for suspecting that a specified offence had been committed.

This case dealt with an application for the confirmation of the order (from Hyundai) and an appeal to the Constitutional Court against that order (from the Investigating Directorate).

The court held that the right to privacy guaranteed in section 14 did not relate solely to the individual within his or her intimate space. When persons moved beyond this established "intimate core," they still retained a right to privacy in the social capacities in which they acted. When people were in their offices, in their cars or on mobile telephones, therefore, they still retained a right to be left alone by the State unless certain conditions were satisfied.

The court also held that juristic persons enjoyed the right to privacy, although not to the same extent as natural persons.

The level of justification for any particular limitation of the right would have to be judged in the light of the circumstances of each case. Relevant circumstances would have included whether the subject of the limitation was a natural person or a juristic person, as well as the nature and effect of the invasion of privacy.

The court held that, where a legislative provision was reasonably capable of a meaning that placed it within constitutional bounds, it should be preserved. Only if this was not possible should resort be had to the remedy of reading in or notional severance.

The provisions of the Act authorising the investigating directorate to engage in preparatory investigations served the purpose of enabling the investigating directorate to be involved in sensitive investigations from an early stage.

The purpose, therefore, was to assist the investigating director to cross the threshold from a mere suspicion that a specified offence had been committed to a reasonable suspicion, which was a prerequisite for the holding of an inquiry.

The court held that a search warrant could properly be obtained, on the basis of a reasonable suspicion that an offence had been committed, provided that it was considered that further evidence might establish that such an offence was a specified offence.

Furthermore, a warrant would be issued only if it appeared to the judicial officer that there were reasonable grounds for the suspicion that an object connected with the commission of an offence, which might be a specified offence, was on the targeted premises.

It was held that search and seizure provisions, in the context of a preparatory investigation, served an important purpose in the fight against crime. That the State had a pressing interest which involved the security and freedom of the community as a whole was beyond question. It was an objective which was sufficiently important to justify the limitation of the right to privacy of an individual in certain circumstances.

The right was not meant to shield criminal activity or to conceal evidence of crime from the criminal justice process. On the other hand, State officials were not entitled without good cause to invade the premises of persons for purposes of searching and seizing property; there would otherwise be little content left to the right to privacy.

A balance therefore had to be struck between the interests of the individual and that of the State, a task that lay at the heart of the inquiry into the limitation of rights.

The court held that the provision was capable of an interpretation that was consistent with the Constitution: that the proper interpretation permitted a judicial officer to issue a search warrant in respect of a preparatory investigation only when he or she was satisfied that there existed a reasonable suspicion that an offence which might be a specified offence had been committed.

The warrant could be issued only where the judicial officer had concluded that there was a reasonable suspicion that such an offence had been committed, that there were reasonable grounds for believing that objects connected with an investigation into that suspected offence could be found on the relevant premises and, in the exercise of his or her discretion, the judicial officer considered it appropriate to issue a search warrant. These were considerable safeguards protecting the right to privacy of individuals.

Thus the application to have the order confirmed was rejected.

The provision in this case is broadly similar to Chapter 2 of the Criminal Procedure Act. Since this provision passed constitutional muster, it is likely that Chapter 2 will also pass if the constitutionality thereof is challenged in the future.

Notes 
Investigating Directorate: Serious Economic Offences & Others v Hyundai Motor Distributors (Pty) Ltd & Others 2001 (1) SA 545 (CC)

Constitutional Court of South Africa cases
2000 in South African law
2000 in case law